Calothamnus scabridus is a plant in the myrtle family, Myrtaceae and is endemic to the south-west of Western Australia. It is a shrub with needle-shaped, prickly leaves and red flowers with four stamen bundles. (In 2014 Craven, Edwards and Cowley proposed that the species be renamed Melaleuca rosea.)

Description

The flowers have 4 sepals and 4 petals and are in small groups between the older leaves or on old leafless wood. The flower cup (the hypanthium) is at least partly buried in the corky bark.

Taxonomy and naming
Calothamnus scabridus was first formally described in 2010 by Alex George in Nuytsia from a specimen found near Manjimup. The specific epithet (scabridus) is a reference to the rough surface of the leaves.

Distribution and habitat
Calothamnus scabridus occurs north of Denmark in the Jarrah Forest biogeographic region where it grows in loamy soil derived from granite.

Conservation
Calothamnus scabridus is classified as "Priority Two" by the Western Australian government department of parks and wildlife meaning that it is poorly known from a few locations, some of which are in reserves.

References

scabridus
Myrtales of Australia
Plants described in 2010
Endemic flora of Western Australia